The following is the List of European Under-21 Table Tennis Championships medalists.

Results of Events 
The tables below are European Table Tennis Under-21 Champions lists of individual events (Men's and Women's Singles, Men's and Women's Doubles and Mixed).

Men's singles

Women's singles

Men's doubles

Women's doubles

Mixed doubles

References

Table tennis in Europe
European Under-21 Table Tennis Championships medalists